Brian Negron (born ) is a former Puerto Rican male volleyball player. He was part of the Puerto Rico men's national volleyball team.

In 2015 Brian Negron was the youngest player in the Puerto Rican Youth Team and not only the youngest one of the entire tournament. He was also already a young star as he participated so far in two World Championships being only fifteen years old. Negron currently plays volleyball at George Mason University in Fairfax, Virginia. As a senior captain, Negron was the EIVA Newcomer of the Year in 2015 and was a First-Team All-EIVA selection the same year. In 2016, Negron helped guide the Patriots to their first NCAA Tournament appearance since 1988.

References

http://gomason.com/news/2016/4/24/210908623.aspx?path=mvball
http://www.fivb.org/viewPressRelease.asp?No=31876&Language=en#.WoykoRPwZPs

External links
 George Mason Patriots bio
 profile at FIVB.org

1996 births
Living people
Sportspeople from Bayamón, Puerto Rico
Puerto Rican men's volleyball players
Place of birth missing (living people)
George Mason Patriots men's volleyball players